is a Japanese professional footballer who plays as a midfielder for  club Yokohama F. Marinos.

Career
Inoue started his professional career as a specially designated player for Oita Trinita, from Fukuoka University in the 2020 J1 League season. He joined the team fully from the 2021 season and played for two years, making 79 appearances and scoring 2 goals.

In December 2022, it was announced Inoue would be moving to J1 League champions club, Yokohama F. Marinos for the 2023 season.

Career statistics

Club
.

References

External links

1998 births
Living people
Japanese footballers
Association football midfielders
Fukuoka University alumni
J1 League players
J2 League players
Oita Trinita players
Yokohama F. Marinos players